Marek Sobieski (1549/1550 – 1605) was a Polish–Lithuanian noble (szlachcic).

He was a courtier from 1577, a Royal Court Chorąży (chorąży nadworny królewski) from 1581, a castellan of Lublin from 1597, and a voivode of Lublin Voivodeship from c. 1597/98.

He was the grandfather of Jan III Sobieski, the elected King of the Polish–Lithuanian Commonwealth.

References
 http://www.wilanow-palac.pl/sobieski_marek_h_janina_1549_50_1605.html

Secular senators of the Polish–Lithuanian Commonwealth
16th-century births
1605 deaths
Marek